The 1926–27 Prima Divisione was the 1st edition of a second tier tournament of the Italian Football Championship which was organized at national level.

The Carta di Viareggio 

In 1926 the Viareggio Charter reformed the Italian football organization. This important document introduced in the Italian football the status of the non-amatour player receiving a  reimbursement of expenses. In this way FIGC managed to mislead FIFA, that defended strenuously sportive amateurism. 

The fascist Charter transformed the old Northern League into an authoritarian and national committee, the Direttorio Divisioni Superiori, appointed by the FIGC. The second level championship, which took the diminished name of Prima Divisione, consequently had to be reformed to give space to a group of clubs from the southern half of Italy.

Teams selection 
The old Northern Seconda Divisione second-level championship had four local groups, so it was decided to reserve one of them for the clubs from Southern Italy in the new national Prima Divisione. More, some teams from the South were put in the first level championship too, so some Northern clubs were relegated from it. Consequently, solely half of the clubs of the old Northern second level joined the revamped cadet tournament, to give space to their Southern counterparts.

In Southern Italy the situation was different. There, the previous reform of 1921-1922 did not take place, so the pyramid of 1912 had been maintained, with the Prima Divisione, former Prima Categoria, as the sole tournament above the regional level. So, in a lexical continuity, the old Prima Divisione remained the bulk of new one, excluding three promoted teams and the last relegated ones, but with the relevant difference of the elimination of the regional qualifications.

Group A 

 Novara promoted to 1927–28 Divisione Nazionale.
 Speranza Savona relegated, later merged into Savona.

Group B 

 Pro Patria promoted to 1927–28 Divisione Nazionale.
 Udinese later readmitted to fill ceased memberships.

Results

Group C 

 Reggiana promoted to 1927–28 Divisione Nazionale.
 Anconitana later readmitted to fill ceased memberships.

Results

Group D

Events 

 Lazio promoted to 1927–28 Divisione Nazionale.
Bankruptcies
 Ilva Bagnolese and Casertana both bankrupted.
 Palermo relegated and bankrupted.
Mergers
 Pro Italia Taranto merged with Audace Taranto into Taranto.
 Roman merged with Alba and Fortitudo into Roma.

Final Group 

 Novara champions 1926-27.

Results

References 

Serie B seasons
2
Italy